Wayne Alan Northrop (born April 12, 1947) is an American actor known for his parts in soap operas such as Dynasty and Days of Our Lives.

Career
Northrop portrayed chauffeur Michael Culhane on Dynasty from the pilot episode, "Oil" (1981), until the season one finale, "The Testimony" (1981). He returned in the seventh season premiere "The Victory" (1986), and left again in the 1987 episode "The Sublet".

Northrop is best known as Roman Brady on Days of Our Lives, a character he played from 1981–1984, and again from 1991–1994. He next portrayed Rex Stanton on Port Charles from 1997 to 1998. In August 2005, Northrop returned to Days as a new character named Dr. Alex North.

Television filmography
 Dynasty as Michael Culhane (1981, 1986–87) (original cast)
 Days of Our Lives as Roman Brady (1981–84, 1991–94)
 Days of Our Lives as André DiMera (1983)
 Port Charles as Rexford "Rex" Stanton (1997–98)
 Days of Our Lives as Alex North (2005–06)

Personal life
Northrop was born in Sumner, Washington, and earned a B.A. in communications from the University of Washington. He married actress Lynn Herring on May 9, 1981, in Jennings, Louisiana. They have two sons: Hank Wayne, born on January 9, 1991, and Grady Lee, born on July 20, 1993.

References

External links
 

1947 births
Living people
American male soap opera actors
American male television actors
Male actors from Washington (state)
People from Sumner, Washington